Soil organic matter (SOM) is the organic matter component of soil, consisting of plant and animal detritus at various stages of decomposition, cells and tissues of soil microbes, and substances that soil microbes synthesize. SOM provides numerous benefits to the physical and chemical properties of soil and its capacity to provide regulatory ecosystem services. SOM is especially critical for soil functions and quality.

The benefits of SOM result from a number of complex, interactive, edaphic factors; a non-exhaustive list of these benefits to soil function includes improvement of soil structure, aggregation, water retention, soil biodiversity, absorption and retention of pollutants, buffering capacity, and the cycling and storage of plant nutrients. SOM increases soil fertility by providing cation exchange sites and being a reserve of plant nutrients, especially nitrogen (N), phosphorus (P), and sulfur (S), along with micronutrients, which the mineralization of SOM slowly releases. As such, the amount of SOM and soil fertility are significantly correlated.

SOM also acts as a major sink and source of soil carbon (C). Although the C content of SOM varies considerably, SOM is ordinarily estimated to contain 58% C, and "soil organic carbon" (SOC) is often used as a synonym for SOM, with measured SOC content often serving as a proxy for SOM. Soil represents one of the largest C sinks on Earth and is significant in the global carbon cycle and therefore for climate change mitigation. Therefore, SOM/SOC dynamics and the capacity of soils to provide the ecosystem service of carbon sequestration through SOM management have received considerable attention recently.

The concentration of SOM in soils generally ranges from 1% to 6% of the total mass of topsoil for most upland soils. Soils whose upper horizons consist of less than 1% of organic matter are mostly limited to deserts, while the SOM content of soils in low lying, wet areas can be as great as 90%.  Soils containing 12% to 18% SOC are generally classified as organic soils.

It can be divided into 3 genera: the living biomass of microbes, fresh and partially decomposed detritus, and humus. Surface plant litter, i. e., fresh vegetal detritus, is generally excluded from SOM.

Sources

The primary source of SOM is vegetal detritus. In forests and prairies, for example, different organisms decompose the fresh detritus into simpler compounds. This involves several stages, the first being mostly mechanical, and becoming more chemical as decomposition progresses. The microbial decomposers are included in the SOM, and form a food web of organisms that prey upon each other and subsequently become prey.

There are also other herbivores that consume fresh vegetal matter, the residue of which then passes to the soil. The products of the metabolisms of these organisms are the secondary sources of SOM, which also includes their corpses. Some animals, like earthworms, ants, and centipedes contribute to both vertical and horizontal translocation of organic matter.

Additional sources of SOM include plant root exudates and charcoal.

Composition

The water content of most vegetal detritus is in the range of 60% to 90%. The dry matter consists of complex organic matter that is composed primarily of carbon, oxygen, and hydrogen. Although these three elements make up about 92% of the dry weight of the organic matter in soil, other elements are very important for the nutrition of plants, including nitrogen, phosphorus, potassium, sulfur, calcium, magnesium, and many micronutrients.

Organic compounds in vegetal detritus include:
 Carbohydrates that are composed of carbon, hydrogen, and oxygen, and range in complexity from rather simple sugars to the large molecules of cellulose.
 Fats that are composed of glycerids of fatty acids, like butyric, stearic, and oleic. They also include carbon, oxygen, and hydrogen.
 Lignins that are complex compounds, form the older parts of wood, and also are composed primarily of carbon, oxygen, and hydrogen. They are resistant to decomposition.
 Proteins that include nitrogen in addition to carbon, hydrogen, and oxygen; and small amounts of sulfur, iron, and phosphorus.
 Charcoal, which is elemental carbon that is derived from incomplete combustion of organic matter. It is resistant to decomposition.

Decomposition

Vegetal detritus in general is not soluble in water and therefore is inaccessible to plants. It constitutes, nevertheless, the raw matter from which plant nutrients derive. Soil microbes decompose it through enzymatic biochemical processes, obtain the necessary energy from the same matter, and produce the mineral compounds that plant roots are apt to absorb. The decomposition of organic compounds specifically into mineral, i. e., inorganic, compounds is denominated "mineralization". A portion of organic matter is not mineralized and instead decomposed into stable organic matter that is denominated "humus".

The decomposition of organic compounds occurs at very different rates, depending on the nature of the compound. The ranking, from fast to slow rates, is:

 Sugars, starches, and simple proteins
 Proteins
 Hemicelluloses
 Cellulose
 Lignins and fats

The reactions that occur can be included in one of 3 genera:

 Enzymatic oxidation that produces carbon dioxide, water, and heat. It affects the majority of the matter.
 A series of specific reactions liberates and mineralizes the essential elements nitrogen, phosphorus, and sulfur.
 Compounds that are resistant to microbial action are formed by modification of the original compounds or by microbial synthesis of new ones to produce humus.

The mineral products are:

Humus

As vegetal detritus decomposes, some microbially resistant compounds are formed, including modified lignins, oils, fats, and waxes. Secondly, some new compounds are synthesized, like polysaccharides and polyuronids. These compounds are the basis of humus. New reactions occur between these compounds and some proteins and other products that contain nitrogen, thus incorporating nitrogen and avoiding its mineralization. Other nutrients are also protected in this way from mineralization.

Humic substances
Humic substances are classified into 3 genera based on their solubility in acids and alkalis, and also according to their stability:

 Fulvic acid is the genus that contains the matter that has the lowest molecular weight, is soluble in acids and alkalis, and is susceptible to microbial action.
 Humic acid is the genus that contains the intermediate matter that has medial molecular weight, is soluble in alkalis and insoluble in acids, and has some resistance to microbial action.
 Humin is the genus that contains the matter that has the greatest molecular weight, is the darkest in color, is insoluble in acids and alkalis, and has the greatest resistance to microbial action.

Function in carbon cycling

Soil has a crucial function in the global carbon cycle, with the global soil carbon pool estimated to be 2,500 gigatons. This is 3.3 times the amount of the atmospheric pool at 750 gigatons and 4.5 times the biotic pool at 560 gigatons. The pool of organic carbon, which occurs primarily in the form of SOM, accounts for approximately 1,550 gigatons of the total global carbon pool, with soil inorganic carbon (SIC) accounting for the remainder. The pool of organic carbon exists in dynamic equilibrium between gains and losses; soil may therefore serve as either a sink or source of carbon, through sequestration or greenhouse gas emissions, respectively, depending on exogenous factors.

See also 
 Biotic material
 Detritus
 Immobilization (soil science)
 Mineralization (soil science)
 Organic matter
 Soil Science

References

Soil improvers
Organic farming
composting